On the evening of 5 February 2004, at least 21 Chinese illegal immigrants were drowned by an incoming tide at Morecambe Bay in North West England, while harvesting cockles off the Lancashire coast. Fifteen other labourers from the same group managed to return safely to shore.

During the subsequent investigation and trial, it emerged that the labourers were inexperienced, spoke little or no English and were unfamiliar with the area. The Chinese gangmaster who organised the trip and two associates of his were found guilty of manslaughter, breaking of immigration laws and other crimes, and were sentenced to several years in prison.

Disaster
David Anthony Eden Sr. and David Anthony Eden Jr., a father and son from England, had allegedly arranged to pay a group of Chinese workers £5 per 25 kg (9p per lb) of cockles. The workers had been trafficked via containers into Liverpool, and were hired out through local criminal agents of international Chinese Triads. The cockles to be collected are best found at low tide on sand flats at Warton Sands, near Hest Bank. Some 30 cockle pickers set out at 4 pm. The Chinese workers were unfamiliar with local geography, language, and custom. They were cut off by the incoming tide in the bay around 9:30 p.m.

The emergency services were alerted by a mobile phone call made by one of the workers, who spoke little English and was only able to say "sinking water" before the call was cut off. An extensive search and rescue operation was launched. Twenty-one bodies, of men and women between the ages of 18 and 45, were recovered from the bay after the incident. Two of the victims were women; the rest were mostly young men in their 20s and 30s, with only two being over 40 and only one, a male, under 20. Most of the victims were previously employed as farmers, and two were fishermen. All the bodies were found between the cockling area and shore, indicating that most had attempted to swim but had been overcome by hypothermia. Four of the victims died after the truck they used to reach the cockling area became overwhelmed by water. A further two cocklers were believed to have been with those drowned, with remains of one being found in 2010.

At the subsequent hearing, British cocklers returning to shore on the same evening were reported to have attempted to warn the Chinese group by tapping their watches and trying to speak with them. A survivor testified that the leader of the group had made a mistake about the time of the tides. Fourteen other members of the group are reported to have made it safely to the shore, making 15 survivors in total. The workers were all illegal immigrants, mainly from the Fujian province of China, and have been described as being untrained and inexperienced.

Prosecutions

David Anthony Eden Sr. and David Anthony Eden Jr., from Prenton, Merseyside, who bought cockles from the work gang, were cleared of helping the workers break immigration law.

Gangmaster Lin Liang Ren was found guilty of the manslaughter of at least 21 people (two further cocklers were thought to have been killed, but their bodies were never found). Ren, his girlfriend Zhao Xiao Qing and his cousin Lin Mu Yong were also convicted of breaking immigration laws. Ren was sentenced to 12 years for manslaughter, 6 years for facilitating illegal immigration (to be served concurrently with the manslaughter sentence), and 2 years for conspiracy to pervert the course of justice (to be served subsequent to the manslaughter sentence). Lin Mu Yong was sentenced to four years and nine months. Zhao Xiao Qing was sentenced to 2 years and 9 months for facilitation of illegal immigration and perverting the course of justice.

Media
The 2006 film Ghosts, directed by Nick Broomfield, is a dramatisation of the events leading up to the disaster.

A 2006 documentary Death in the Bay: The Cocklepickers' Story, was commissioned by Channel 4 as part of The Other Side from local filmmaker Loren Slater, who was one of the first people on the scene.

In 2009, Ed Pien's work Memento, commissioned by the Chinese Arts Centre, was developed in response to the plight of illegal immigrants, especially those who died at Morecambe Bay.

In 2010, artist Isaac Julien released his film Ten Thousand Waves about the disaster.

The 2007 folk song "On Morecambe Bay" by folk artist Kevin Littlewood tells the story of the events. This song was later covered by folk musician Christy Moore.

See also
 Gangmasters and Labour Abuse Authority

References

External links
 BBC report, February 2004
 BBC report on inquest
 BBC report on the distress call
 BBC report on trial, January 2006
 BBC report, Lin Liang Ren found guilty
 BBC report,  Cockler gangmaster gets 14 years
 Cockler survivor hates gangmaster
 Charity for the survivors
 movie website
 Ghosts on More4

2004 crimes in the United Kingdom
2004 disasters in the United Kingdom
2004 in England
2000s in Cumbria
2000s in Lancashire
2000s trials
Chinese community in the United Kingdom
Crime in Cumbria
Crime in Lancashire
Deaths by drowning
Disasters in Cumbria
Disasters in Lancashire
February 2004 crimes
February 2004 events in the United Kingdom
Fishing disasters
Illegal immigration to the United Kingdom
Manslaughter in England
Manslaughter trials
Migrant disasters in the United Kingdom
Cockling disaster
Trials in England